Hedwig of Brandenburg (23 February 1540 – 21 October 1602), a member of the Hohenzollern dynasty, was Duchess of Brunswick-Lüneburg and Princess of Brunswick-Wolfenbüttel from 1568 to 1589, by her marriage with the Welf duke Julius.

Life 
Born at the City Palace in Cölln (today part of Berlin), Hedwig was a younger daughter of Elector Joachim II Hector of Brandenburg (1505–1571) from his second marriage with Hedwig Jagiellon (1513–1573), a daughter of King Sigismund I of Poland.  Her elder sister Elizabeth Magdalena was married to Duke Francis Otto of Brunswick-Lüneburg in 1559; however, her husband died in the same year.

One year later, on 25 February 1560, Hedwig was married in Cölln on the Spree river to the Welf prince Julius of Brunswick-Lüneburg (1528–1589).  The couple had met at the Küstrin court of Margrave John of Brandenburg, where Julius had fled from his wayward father, Duke Henry V

After Julius had reconciled with his father, who had agreed only reluctantly to the marriage of his son with a Protestant princess, the couple received the castles of Hessen and Schladen as residences.  As Julius's elder brothers had been killed in the 1553 Battle of Sievershausen, Duke Henry V was alleged to have appeared at Hessen Castle and let himself into the room of his daughter-in-law, took her newborn son Henry Julius from the cradle and exclaimed: You'll now have to be my beloved son!

In 1568 Julius succeeded his father as ruling Prince of Brunswick-Wolfenbüttel.  He turned out to be a capable ruler; nevertheless, he later came under the fraudulent influence of the alchemists Philipp Sömmering and Anne Marie Schombach (nicknamed Schlüter-Liese), whom he received at the Wolfenbüttel court in 1571, and gradually estranged from his wife.

Hedwig was described as a pious and humble, with preference for domestic activities.  In 1598, the theologician Stephan Prätorius dedicated his book  ("The Widow's Consolation") to Hedwig.

Issue 
From her marriage to Julius, Hedwig had following children:
 Sophie Hedwig (1561–1631)
 married in 1577 Duke Ernest Louis of Pomerania-Wolgast (1545-1592)
 Henry Julius (1564–1613), Duke of Brunswick-Wolfenbüttel, married:
 in 1585, Princess Dorothea of Saxony (1563–1587)
 in 1590, Princess Elizabeth of Denmark (1573–1625)
 Maria (1566–1626)
 married in 1582, Duke Francis II of Saxe-Lauenburg (1547-1619)
 Elisabeth (1567–1618), married
 in 1583 to Count Adolf XI of Holstein-Schauenburg (d. 1601)
 in 1604 to Duke Christopher of Brunswick-Harburg (d. 1606)
 Philip Sigismund (1568–1623), Bishop of Osnabrück and Verden
 Margaret (1571–1580)
 Joachim Charles (1573–1615)
 Sabine Catharina (1574–1590)
 Dorothea Augusta (1577–1625), Abbess of Gandersheim
 Julius Augustus (1578–1617), abbot of Michaelstein Abbey
 Hedwig (1580–1657)
 married in 1621 Duke Otto III of Brunswick-Harburg (1572-1641)

References 
 Inge Mager: Die Konkordienformel im Fürstentum Braunschweig-Wolfenbüttel, Vandenhoeck & Ruprecht, 1993, p. 22 ff

Footnotes

External links 

Hedwig
Hedwig
1540 births
1602 deaths
16th-century German people
Hedwig
Daughters of monarchs